Liam McGing (born 11 December 1998) is an Australian professional soccer player who plays as a defender for Finn Harps.

Professional career
On 21 May 2019, McGing made his professional debut in the 2019 AFC Champions League in a group stage match against Kawasaki Frontale.

On 23 November 2019, McGing made his A-League debut, coming on as a sub for the Wellington Phoenix in their 2–1 win over the Brisbane Roar. It was the Phoenix first win of the 2019–20 season.

On 2 November 2020, McGing signed a one-year contract to stay on with the Phoenix.

In November 2021, McGing signed a short-term contract with Sydney FC.

Personal life
McGing is the younger brother of Jake McGing who also plays in the A-League.

References

External links

1998 births
Living people
Australian soccer players
Association football defenders
Sydney FC players
Wellington Phoenix FC players
National Premier Leagues players
Finn Harps F.C. players
League of Ireland players
Expatriate association footballers in the Republic of Ireland